RB Ranchhodlal Chhotalal Girls High School  is a girls high School, located in Ahmadabad, Gujarat, India. It is one of the oldest girls school of the country.

History
The school was started by Gujarat Vernacular Society in 1892. It was named as RB Ranchhodlal Chhotalal Girls High School, after the chief donor, the textile-mill pioneer of Gujarat, Rao Bahadur Seth Ranchhodlal Chhotalal It was not only the first girls school of the town but also of Gujarat. The school was guided by noted women activist Vidyagauri Nilkanth in first half of 20th century.

Present Status
The school still provides quality education to girls which is located at Khadia, Ahmedabad in old town. The school teacher was awarded prestigious Government of India - CCRT Teachers Award in 1988.

References

Schools in Colonial India
Educational institutions established in 1892
Schools in Ahmedabad
Girls' schools in Gujarat
1892 establishments in India
Private schools in Gujarat